Sun Zi's Tactics (Chinese: 孫子攻略) is a historical manhua series by Lee Chi Ching, published in Hong Kong and Japan. In 2007, the series was named winner of Japan's first International Manga Award. It is based on the life of Chinese general and philosopher Sun Tzu (aka Sun Zi).

Synopsis
During the chaos and confusion at the end of the Eastern Zhou Dynasty, Wu Zixu and Sun Zi leave their native land of Chu for the land of Wu after their parents are killed. They take an oath of allegiance to fight for King Helü of Wu. The story portrays the life of Sun Zi and the superior art of war that he develops during the two year conflict between Wu and Chu.

External links
 Sun Zi's Tactics Preview @ Culturecom Comics

Historical comics
Hong Kong comics titles
International Manga Award winners
Biographical comics
Comics set in the 5th century BC
War comics
1995 comics debuts
2006 comics endings
Comics based on real people
Comics set in China
Cultural depictions of Sun Tzu